Kiew may refer to:
The German or archaic English variant spelling of Kyiv
KiEw (band), a German band
An alternate spelling of the name of Somdet Kiaw, the Acting Supreme Patriarch of Thailand
An alternate spelling of Kyiv, the capital of Ukraine